The Trigo Cup also known as the Ulster Greyhound Derby was a greyhound racing competition held annually at Celtic Park in Belfast, Northern Ireland.

It was introduced in 1926 when William Barnett presented a cup to Celtic Park after his horse Trigo won The Derby and St Leger Stakes. The Trigo Cup would gain classic status some years later in 1944.

From 1966 it was sponsored by Guinness and became known as the Guinness Ulster Derby and Trigo Cup. The race ended following the closure of Celtic Park.

Past winners

Discontinued

Venues & Distances 
1929-1931	(Celtic Park, 640y)
1932-1933	(Celtic Park, 600y)
1935-1940 	(Celtic Park, 550y)
1944-1980 	(Celtic Park, 525y)

References

Greyhound racing competitions in Ireland
Sports competitions in Belfast
Recurring sporting events established in 1929